The Cowboy Musketeer is a 1925 American silent Western film directed by Robert De Lacey and starring Tom Tyler, Frankie Darro, and David Dunbar. In the film, a cowboy helps a woman find the hidden gold mine she has inherited from her father before others can get their hands on it.

Plot
As described in a film magazine review, Tom Latigo, a roving cowboy, rescues a desperado from a posse and out of gratitude the desperado reveals a plot by another man to steal from a young woman a valuable gold claim. The cowboy starts out to prevent the plotters from stealing the claim. His life and the life of Leila Gordon, the young woman who has inherited the claim from her father, are several times endangered during the events that ensue, including when Tom saves her from being trampled under the hoofs of a cattle stampede. However, from each danger the pair escapes, and finally the villains are arrested and brought to justice.

Cast
 Tom Tyler as Tom Latigo
 Frankie Darro as Billy Gordon
 Frances Dare as Leila Gordon
 David Dunbar as Tony Vaquerrelli
 Tom London as Joe Dokes

References

External links

Still 1 and 2 from the Metropolitan Museum of Art

1925 films
1925 Western (genre) films
Films directed by Robert De Lacey
American black-and-white films
Film Booking Offices of America films
Silent American Western (genre) films
1920s English-language films
1920s American films